In music, Op. 90 stands for Opus number 90. Compositions that are assigned this number include:

 Beethoven – Piano Sonata No. 27
 Brahms – Symphony No. 3
 Dvořák – Piano Trio No. 4
 Klebe – Die Fastnachtsbeichte
 Mendelssohn – Symphony No. 4
 Schubert – Op. 90 Impromptus
 Schumann – 6 Gedichte  und Requiem